Panic Stations is a term originating from a naval command which may refer to:

Panic Stations, a 1975 comedy play by Derek Benfield
Panic Stations, a 1995 novel by Judith Clarke
Panic Stations, a 2009 collection of cartoons by Sempé
Panic Stations (album), a 2015 album by American rock band Motion City Soundtrack

"Panic Station" (song)  by English rock band Muse  2013